Marlena Kowalewska, née Pleśnierowicz (born 9 January 1992) is a Polish volleyball player. She is part of the Poland women's national volleyball team.

She participated in the 2018 FIVB Volleyball Women's Nations League.

Clubs

References

External links 
 CEV profile
 FIVB profile

1992 births
Living people
Polish women's volleyball players
Place of birth missing (living people)